The Territorial Prelature of Lábrea is a territorial prelature located in the city of Lábrea in the Ecclesiastical province of Porto Velho in Brazil.

History
 1 May 1925: Established as Territorial Prelature of Lábrea from the Diocese of Amazonas

Leadership
 Bishops of Lábrea (Roman rite), in reverse chronological order
 Bishop Santiago Sánchez Sebastián, O.A.R. (2016.04.13 - )
 Bishop Jesús Moraza Ruiz de Azúa, O.A.R. (1994.01.12 – 2016.04.13)
 Bishop Florentino Zabalza Iturri, O.A.R. (1971.06.07 – 1994.01.12)
 Bishop Mário Roberto Emmett Anglim, C.Ss.R. (Apostolic Administrator 1970.05.02 – 1971.06.07)
 Bishop José del Perpetuo Socorro Alvarez Mácua, O.A.R. (1944 – 1967.11.30)
 Fr. Inácio Martinez (1930.06.13 – 1942)
 Fr. Marcelo Calvo (Apostolic Administrator 1925 – 1930)

References

 GCatholic.org
 Catholic Hierarchy

Roman Catholic dioceses in Brazil
Christian organizations established in 1925
Labrea, Territorial Prelature of
Roman Catholic dioceses and prelatures established in the 20th century
Territorial prelatures